John Hood (3 December 1859 – 11 February 1919) was a rear admiral of the United States Navy during World War I. He was also a veteran of the Spanish–American War.

Biography
Hood was born in Florence, Alabama, on 3 December 1859. He was appointed to the United States Naval Academy in 1875, and graduated from the Naval Academy, second in his class, with only Randolph H. Miner having a higher order of merits. Hood was wrecked with Kearsarge on 21 February 1894 near Roncador Cay off Central America in the Pacific. He was a lieutenant in the battleship  when she was blown up at Havana on 15 February 1898.

Hood commanded the gunboat  during the Spanish–American War, and carried information of the arrival of the Spanish Caribbean Squadron off Santiago, Cuba, to Commodore Winfield S. Schley, the commander of the Flying Squadron at Cienfuegos, and delivered orders for him to proceed to Santiago on 23 May 1898. He also served in the collier  during the war. Hood surveyed the Pacific in 1899–1900 to prepare data and charts by which the Pacific telegraph cable was laid.

Hood commanded the gunboat  in Chinese waters during the Russo-Japanese War from 1903 to 1905, and the protected cruiser  from 1907 to 1909, during Haitian and Central American revolutions and elections. He was in charge of the ships at the Naval Academy in 1909 and 1910. He commanded the battleship  of the Atlantic Fleet in 1910–11. Under him in 1911–12,  won the battle efficiency pennant. From 1912 to 1915 he was a member of the General Board of the Navy. In 1915–16 he commanded the battleship  which won the "Red E" for excellence in engineering efficiency.

He was promoted to rear admiral on 29 August 1916, and retired on 18 March 1918. Admiral Hood died of Bright's disease at the Naval Hospital, Annapolis, Maryland, on 11 February 1919.

Namesake
In 1943, the destroyer  was named in his honor.

References

External links

1859 births
1919 deaths
United States Navy admirals
United States Naval Academy alumni
United States Navy personnel of the Spanish–American War
United States Navy personnel of World War I
People from Florence, Alabama
Burials at Arlington National Cemetery
Military personnel from Alabama